Miss Brazil 2017, officially Miss Brazil Be Emotion 2017, was the 63rd edition of the Miss Brazil pageant. It was held on 19 August 2017 at the Vermelhos Theater in Ilhabela, São Paulo, Brazil and was hosted by Cássio Reis with Rayza Nicácio as a backstage correspondent. Raissa Santana of Paraná crowned her successor Monalysa Alcântara of Piauí at the end of the event. Alcântara represented Brazil at the Miss Universe 2017 pageant and placed in the Top 10.

Results

Special Awards

Contestants

References

External links 
Official Miss Brasil Website

2017
2017 in Brazil
2017 beauty pageants